

August Schmidt (3 November 1892 – 17 January  1972) was a German general who commanded the 10th Panzergrenadier Division during World War II. He was a recipient of the  Knight's Cross of the Iron Cross with Oak Leaves of Nazi Germany.

Schmidt surrendered to the Red Army in April 1945. Convicted as a war criminal in the Soviet Union, he was held until 1955.

Awards and decorations
 Iron Cross (1914) 2nd Class (14 September 1914) & 1st Class  (14 October 1916)
 Clasp to the Iron Cross (1939) 2nd Class (17 September 1939) & 1st Class  (1 October 1939)
 Knight's Cross of the Iron Cross with Oak Leaves
 Knight's Cross on 27 October 1939 as Oberst and commander of 20th Infantry Regiment
 Oak Leaves on 23 January 1944 as Generalleutnant and commander of the 10th Panzergrenadier Division

References

Citations

Bibliography

 
 

1892 births
1972 deaths
People from the Kingdom of Bavaria
Lieutenant generals of the German Army (Wehrmacht)
German Army personnel of World War I
Recipients of the clasp to the Iron Cross, 1st class
Recipients of the Knight's Cross of the Iron Cross with Oak Leaves
Recipients of the Military Merit Cross (Mecklenburg-Schwerin), 1st class
German prisoners of war in World War II held by the Soviet Union
Military personnel from Fürth
Burials at Munich Waldfriedhof
German Army generals of World War II